The climate of Los Angeles is mild to hot year-round, and mostly dry. It is classified as a Mediterranean climate, which is a type of dry subtropical climate.  It is characterized by seasonal changes in rainfall—with a dry summer and a winter rainy season. Under the modified Köppen climate classification, the coastal areas are classified as Csb, and the inland areas as Csa.

Classifications

Temperatures and seasons
The primary weather station for Los Angeles is located near downtown at the University of Southern California campus, and this article refers primarily to climate data generated by this station as representative of the Los Angeles metropolitan area as a whole.

Los Angeles has a hot-summer Mediterranean climate (Köppen Csa), with hot, dry summers, and mild-to-warm winters, with increased precipitation. While the typical dry-summer and wet-winter pattern typical of most Mediterranean climates is part of the climate of Los Angeles, precipitation annually is lower than in many typical Mediterranean climates, giving it semi-arid characteristics.

The summer dry season normally runs from May through October, when clear skies, hot temperatures, and very little change in sensible weather occur from day to day. Average high temperatures are in the lower 80's F (26-28 C) with overnight lows in the lower 60's F (15-17 C). During this season, there is essentially no rainfall, and both July and August average less than 0.05 of an inch (1.27 mm) of monthly precipitation.

The winter wet season normally runs from November through April. Precipitation episodes in Los Angeles, with a few notable exceptions, are largely caused by extratropical disturbances approaching California from the west or northwest during the winter season. The normal seasonal rainfall measured at downtown Los Angeles is 14.77 inches, of which 92% falls between November 1 and April 30. While there is a great increase in rainfall in the winter months, the winter months in Los Angeles are still frequently sunny and pleasant with mild -to-warm temperatures. The average highs range from the upper 60's F to lower 70's F (17-21 C) with cooler overnight lows in the upper 40's and lower 50's F (8-12 C). Warm winter temperatures give the city subtropical characteristics.

Summer

Summers are warm to hot, and nearly completely dry. The summer temperature pattern usually begins in late June or early July, and lasts through September or October, although it may start as early as  late May. However, temperatures across the region often exceed  during the summer. This happens when an atmospheric high-pressure area becomes dominant over the Great Basin of Nevada and Utah (a frequent occurrence), and the resulting offshore flow of the atmospheric air mass shuts off the normal coastal sea breeze in Los Angeles. Even though 113°F is the record high it still fell to 77°F. The all time record high minimum temperature of 84 °F took place on September 21st, 1939. L.A RecordTemps. Skies are nearly constantly sunny, unless interrupted in late spring and early summer by the June Gloom pattern, which is unpredictable year-to-year. The North American Monsoon can bring occasional thunderstorms and high humidity to Los Angeles in the summer and early fall.

Winter
Downtown/USC station has recorded a record-low high temperature of 43°F on January 9th, 1922. Regardless of this record, the high temperature almost never ever fails to hit 50°F all winter long. The last severe cold outbreak in the Los Angeles area occurred in December 1990, when temperatures dropped below freezing across a major portion of the coastal plain, and into the low to mid 20s F over inland valleys. Temperatures stayed below freezing for up to eight hours at some valley locations, resulting in significant damage to plants and commercial agriculture.

In the winter months, high pressure systems over the deserts often bring Santa Ana winds, resulting in dry, and dusty days. On rare occasion, temperatures can reach into the  range during Santa Ana Winds even in December or January. Sunny skies characteristically dominate the weather pattern in the winter season, mixed in with the occasional rain producing weather system. Christmas on very rare occasion can feel like the Southern Hemisphere with a record high of 85°F in 1980. Simultaneously, New York City on the East Coast had a record low of -1°F the same day Christmas Extremes in USA. Although, this type of heat does not occur each December and milder conditions in the mid 60s- low 70s are generally expected throughout the Los Angeles region.

Spring and autumn
Spring and autumn hardly exist as such in this climate. Summer temperature patterns of  highs and  lows usually persist until early November. Likewise, the "winter-season" temperature pattern of  highs and  lows may last through April or May, periodically interrupted by hot Santa Ana wind events for up to a week at a time. The rainy season always ends by mid-May.

Rainfall

Most rain occurs during the winter and early to mid spring, typical of a Mediterranean climate. However, the amount received is usually lower than in other Mediterranean climates. The first sporadic rainfall of the rainy season usually occurs in October or November, with heavy rain becoming more common late November through early April. Pineapple Express storms may occur from December to March. February, on average, is the wettest month. The rains then taper off in April or by May, which usually see only two to three light rain showers. However, the timing and volume of rains in the winter is highly variable. After a significant rain, the region's air is cleared of the usual atmospheric haze as well as man-made smog, giving exceptionally clear views across the giant metropolis.

Most cold fronts and depressions spun off by the polar low, the strong winter seasonal low-pressure area in the Gulf of Alaska, fail to carry significant precipitable moisture as far south as Los Angeles, resulting in the region's relatively low average rainfall amount of  even in normal years. However, a "normal" year rarely occurs, since rainfall in Los Angeles is subject to the position and strength of the jet stream, and the strength of the Gulf of Alaska low. Some years, a well-developed series of cold fronts moves into the area with relatively short separation between each, bringing intermittently rainy periods to Los Angeles for several weeks at a time. If this pattern persists in a rainy season, significantly above-average precipitation will be received. Other years, especially in the drought years of 2012–2016, a blocking region of atmospheric high pressure over the eastern Pacific Ocean, between Alaska and the Pacific Northwest, diverts the jet stream and its flow of cold fronts far to the north through Canada and down into the U.S. Midwest, leaving the U.S. west coast and especially Los Angeles under warm and dry conditions for weeks to months at a time.

Because the rainy season begins in late fall and ends in early to mid spring, precipitation is measured using the water year instead of the calendar year, to give an accurate picture of each rainy season's precipitation amounts. Each water year begins October 1 and ends the following September 30, during the driest part of the year.

Sometimes rainfall can occur in the summer from westward-straying monsoon thunderstorms, but this is unusual. Even less common is rain from remnants of dissipating eastern Pacific hurricanes. Los Angeles averages only  of precipitation per year, and this is lower at the coast and higher in the mountains and foothill cities. This will usually occur during the summer months (usually in July–September). Snow is extremely rare in the Greater Los Angeles area and basin, but the nearby San Gabriel Mountains and San Bernardino Mountains typically receive a heavy amount of snow every winter season.

El Niño–Southern Oscillation
Historically, the warm phase of an El Niño–Southern Oscillation (ENSO) regime typically coincides with above-average precipitation across Southern California. The above-average sea-surface temperatures in the equatorial Pacific Ocean are largely responsible for this as the ocean acts as a rich moisture source for tropical moisture to advect towards the North American continent in atmospheric river events. Prior to the strong El Niño of 2015–2016, the previous two strong El Niño events in 1982–83 and 1997–98 coincided with well above average precipitation across Southern California. While some measurements suggest the 2015-2016 El Niño was the strongest on record since 1950, Southern California received below average precipitation contrary to what the Climate Prediction Center predicted leading up to the winter months.

Surrounding areas in the region

Coastal basin
The Los Angeles Basin, composed of the coastal plain surrounded by mountains, is generally the coolest in summer and mildest in winter. Overall, it receives less rainfall than the surrounding valleys and mountains.

Los Angeles International Airport
Los Angeles International Airport airport and its surroundings (Westchester and El Segundo, as well as Santa Monica, Venice, and the immediately surrounding neighborhoods) are generally the coolest part of the region in the summer, as they receive a near-constant sea breeze. Santa Monica and its environs may be  cooler than areas only  further inland. Under the Köppen climate classification, the airport has a semi-arid climate due to its modest winter rainfall and mild mean temperatures. For monthly statistics, see Climate of Los Angeles#Temperatures and seasons

Santa Monica
Santa Monica has mean temperatures low enough for its precipitation numbers to still retain a cool-summer Mediterranean climate (Csb).

Culver City, Inglewood and Palms area
Culver City, Inglewood,  Palms, and surrounding areas are only a few miles inland from Santa Monica and the beach, but reach temperatures up to 10 degrees (F) warmer on average in the summer. Culver City has a semi-arid climate that is still significantly moderated by the Pacific trade winds keeping averages mild compared to areas farther inland.

Long Beach
Long Beach sits on a south-facing section of coast, and does not receive as much sea breeze cooling from the prevailing westerly/south-westerly winds (as these winds may pass over the Palos Verdes Peninsula, San Pedro, and the twin ports first). Long Beach's high temperature can compete with those of downtown Los Angeles. Locations further north in Long Beach, which stretches over  northward from the water, can be considerably warmer than Long Beach's coast and airport weather station.

San Fernando Valley
The San Fernando Valley is known for significantly higher temperatures than the coastal basin. Canoga Park and Woodland Hills, in the south-west end of the valley, typically record the highest temperatures. The all-time high of  nearly rivals the record high temperatures of Phoenix, Arizona and Palm Springs. The city of Burbank, at the eastern end of the Valley, is also known for being significantly hotter than downtown Los Angeles, which is only  to the south. During winter both the Canoga Park and Burbank weather stations are significantly wetter than some coastal stations and thus retain hot-summer Mediterranean climates (Csa). By comparison, Canoga Park has quite cool summer nights, in contrast to many other interior Southern California areas.

Orange County

North/Central Orange County
Whilst Santa Ana sits firmly on the border between the semi-arid and the hot-summer Mediterranean climate, Anaheim is firmly a semi-arid climate with very low precipitation for the Los Angeles metropolitan area.

Extreme weather

Records
In downtown Los Angeles, weather records began on July 1, 1877.

Snowfall inside the city of Los Angeles is rare. The record snowfall occurred on January 19, 1949, when   of snow fell inside city limits, however Burbank reported 4.7 inches. Since official records were first kept in 1877, the downtown Los Angeles weather station observed measurable snowfall three times, in 1882, 1932, and 1949.

Santa Ana winds

The Santa Ana winds are strong, extremely dry offshore winds that characteristically sweep across Southern California and northern Baja California during late September into early May. They range from hot to cold, depending on the prevailing temperatures in the source region, the Great Basin and upper Mojave Desert. Nevertheless, the winds are notorious for causing hot, dry weather due to compressional heating of the lower atmosphere.

Notable Santa Ana windstorms happen several times a year between fall and spring. Once every several years a strong windstorm causes significant damage, toppling or uprooting large old trees and damaging structures across the region.

Heavy rains, landslides, and debris flows
While overall precipitation is low, the rain that does fall occasionally comes in brief heavy storms. Combined with steep mountain slopes and recent burn areas from wildfires, these heavy rains often cause landslides and debris flows in foothill areas, damaging structures and blocking roads.

Thunderstorms, lightning, and tornadoes
Textbook cumulonimbus-formed summer thunderstorms are fairly rare in Los Angeles, because the atmosphere over the coastal basin is generally too stable and dry, especially during summer, to allow the strong vertical development necessary for mature cumulonimbus clouds. Full, mature thunderstorms can develop in the surrounding deserts and mountains during the summer North American Monsoon, but rarely over the Los Angeles metropolitan region and coastal basin, where the moisture is coming off of the Gulf of Mexico and the Gulf of California. This atmospheric stability is largely due to the cool and persistent marine layer, which is fueled by the constant influx of cold Pacific water via the California Current. Summer thunderstorms that do manage to form on the coastal basin are typically associated with the North American Monsoon and/or tropical cyclones, or downburst winds followed by weak tornadoes, which can bring enough tropical heat and moisture to overcome the cool marine layer, destabilizing the atmosphere.

Though still relatively rare, thunderstorms most often occur during warm southerly-flow winter rain storms. These warm storms are different from the typical northwesterly cold fronts that bring most of the region's winter precipitation. Atmospheric instability caused by these warm winter storm systems allows the formation of small, weak, isolated thunderstorms, which tend to move across the area quickly, producing a few rumbles of thunder, and soon dissipate back into the larger rain storm system. Occasionally, these bring impressive displays of lightning, hail, and damaging winds to small localities within the region. Small, weak, isolated tornadoes can occur during these events, but are exceedingly rare. Likewise, weak-to-moderate-strength waterspouts may form over the ocean (typically off the stretch of coast between Long Beach and Huntington Beach) during warm winter storms, but again, this is very rare.

Sea temperatures

Ultraviolet index

Notes

References

Environment of Greater Los Angeles
Los Angeles
Los Angeles metropolitan area
Greater Los Angeles
Climate of California
Southern California